Kang Sung-hoon (hangul:강성훈, born February 22, 1980) is a South Korean singer, best known as a former member of the 90s South Korean boy group Sechs Kies. While in Sechskies, Sunghoon was the main vocalist. After SechsKies had disbanded in 2000, Sung-hoon pursued a solo singing career, signed under Laful Entertainment at the time. His nickname Hoony is the title for his third album. Sunghoon joined Sechskies for their reunion in 2016, but left the group in early 2019 due to ongoing scandals.

Career

SechsKies 
Kang Sung-hoon, who was studying abroad in Hawaii, was scouted by DSP Entertainment, along with friend Eun Ji-won in a nightclub. They were supposed to debut as a duo. However, as H.O.T. became such a big hit, DSP decided to make a six-member male idol group. But Kang Sung-hoon refused to join the six-member group. Lee Ho-yeon, the DSP CEO, persuaded Kang Sung-hoon by giving him right of veto. Accordingly, the other 4 members was selected with Kang Sung-hoon's consent.

SechsKies debuted on April 15, 1997 on KMTV Show! Music Tank with their first single, "School Byeolgok (학원별곡)”.
  
Kang Sung-hoon was the main vocalist of SechsKies. Since he was outgoing, he spoke most in the TV programs. Sechs Kies achieved great success and became an icon of the 1990s Korean idol groups. However, Sechs Kies suddenly disbanded in 2000 after finishing their fourth album promotion.

Solo 
After SechsKies disbanded, Sung-hoon was the second member from Sechs Kies to begin a solo career mainly on R&B and ballad. In 2001, he released first album"비상(Bee Sang)" with title song "고백(Confessions)" and most of the Sechs Kies members chorus "1년 되는 날 (1st Anniversary)".

In 2002, Sung-hoon released second album "Kang Sung Hoon Vol.2" with hit song "My Girl" and received great response. He won 2002 SBS Gayo Daejeon Popularity Award with J-Walk.

On January 22, 2007 Sung-hoon participated in a fashion show called, "Han Bok", which was to raise money to build homes for others. Sung-hoon invested in entertainment industry but has been involved in some messy legal battles for a few years. Finally, he put behind legal troubles and released a re-recording of the hit single "couple" in 2014.

On June 12, 2015, Sung-hoon released 'Someone Make Me Laugh' for SBS weekend drama ‘Divorce Lawyer In Love’ OST

On February 20, 2016, Sung-hoon held small Concert The Fifth Season in Seogang University, Mary Hall Grand Theatre; tickets were reportedly sold out within one minute.

2016–present: Sechs Kies reunion and departure 
In 2016, SechsKies  reunited after their disbandment 16 years prior in a Korean variety TV show called "Infinite Challenge". They held a pop-up reunion concert on April 14, the day before the anniversary of Sechs Kies' debut. Although it was extremely short notice, almost 6000 fans gathered within a few hours to the stadium to see the reunion concert.

On May 11, YG Entertainment officially announced that they signed a contract with Sechs Kies except for Ko Ji-yong. Sung-hoon also signed a solo contract with YG Entertainment.

On May 21 and June 25, Sung-hoon held small fan meeting with 4,000 fans to celebrated his solo debut 15th anniversary at Seoul and Busan Citizens Hall.

On February 25, 2017 Sung-hoon celebrated his birthday party with 3,000 fans at KBS Arena Hall.

On May 28, Sung-hoon held small fan meeting "Back to the songs, Back to you" with 1,300 fans to celebrated his solo debut 16th anniversary at Bluesquare, Samsung Card Hall.

On January 1, 2019, Sung-hoon released a statement via his official fan cafe that he had agreed with YG to terminate his contract as of December 31, 2018 and left Sechs Kies.

On December 22, Sung-hoon released a new single titled, "You Are My Everything."

Discography

Albums

Single
 2014: Couple (Remake)
 2019: You Are My Everything

Others
 2015: Someone Make Me Laugh (날 웃게 한 사람), Divorce Lawyer in Love OST

Music credits

Filmography

Film

Dramas

Variety shows

Awards

M Countdown

|-  
| 2002
| July 3
| "My Girl"
|}

KM Music Tank

|-  
| 2003
| July 25
| "Saved Story"
|}

See also 
 Sechs Kies
 Daesung Entertainment

References

1980 births
K-pop singers
Living people
DSP Media artists
Sechs Kies members
South Korean male singers
South Korean male idols
South Korean pop singers
YG Entertainment artists
Singers from Seoul